The list of shipwrecks in 1902 includes ships sunk, foundered, grounded, or otherwise lost during 1902.

January

2 January

3 January

4 January

6 January

12 January

14 January

17 January

18 January

20 January

21 January

26 January

29 January

31 January

Unknown date

February

1 February

2 February

3 February

5 February

9 February

10 February

11 February

12 February

18 February

22 February

23 February

24 February

25 February

26 February

27 February

28 February

Unknown date

March

1 March

5 March

7 March

10 March

12 March

19 March

22 March

24 March

25 March

28 March

29 March

30 March

31 March

April

1 April

3 April

9 April

11 April

13 April

15 April

20 April

21 April

22 April

23 April

24 April

25 April

26 April

27 April

28 April

30 April

Unknown date

May

2 May

5 May

6 May

7 May

9 May

10 May

13 May

21 May

22 May

24 May

27 May

28 May

Unknown date

June

2 June

5 June

6 June

7 June

10 June

11 June

12 June

22 June

24 June

27 June

28 June

29 June

Unknown date

July

1 July

2 July

3 July

6 July

7 July

8 July

10 July

15 July

20 July

24 July

25 July

28 July

Unknown date

August

3 August

4 August

5 August

6 August

7 August

10 August

13 August

20 August

22 August

24 August

25 August

31 August

September

1 September

3 September

4 September

6 September

7 September

8 September

9 September

10 September

11 September

15 September

17 September

20 September

27 September

Unknown date

October

3 October

6 October

7 October

9 October

10 October

11 October

13 October

14 October

15 October

16 October

18 October

19 October

22 October

23 October

27 October

28 October

29 October

31 October

Unknown date

November

3 November

4 November

5 November

7 November

8 November

9 November

10 November

13 November

14 November

15 November

16 November

17 November

18 November

19 November

20 November

22 November

23 November

25 November

28 November

29 November

30 November

December

3 December

5 December

9 December

10 December

11 December

13 December

14 December

16 December

17 December

23 December

24 December

26 December

27 December

Unknown date

Unknown date

References

1902
 
Ship